Giuseppe Greco (born 19 March 1958 in Lecce, Italy) is an Italian former footballer who played as an attacking midfielder. He played for Torino and Lazio but is best known for his career with Ascoli.

He is Ascoli's leading top-flight scorer, and was the team's joint leading scorer in the 1982–83 season along with Walter De Vecchi, with 7 goals.

External links
 Career Stats 

1958 births
Living people
Italian footballers
Association football midfielders
Italy under-21 international footballers
Italy youth international footballers
Serie A players
Serie B players
Ascoli Calcio 1898 F.C. players
S.S. Lazio players
Torino F.C. players
Bologna F.C. 1909 players
S.S.D. Città di Brindisi players
Potenza S.C. players